Clear Lake State Park is a state park of California, United States, on Clear Lake.  The park is popular for water recreation.  Amenities include 149 developed campsites spread across four campground areas, two group campsites, a swimming beach with showers, a boat launch, and a marina. Since the area is a major breeding ground for grebes, there's a broad "no wake" zone in the Cole Creek launch area and near the reedy shoreline, which is conducive to canoeing and kayaking.  The  park was established in 1949.

Proposed for closure
Clear Lake State Park was one of the 48 California state parks proposed for closure in January 2008 and again in Fall 2009, as part of a deficit reduction program. The state budget ultimately retained the parks as open, with austerity budgets.

Campground
Clear Lake State Park has four campgrounds: Cole Creek, Kelsey Creek, Lower Bayview, and Upper Bayview.   All sites can fit campers/trailers but offer no hookups. Each campsite has a fire ring, table, food storage box and restroom facilities with pay showers nearby, some sites feature water access to either Clear Lake, Kelsey Slough or Cole Creek.  Clear Lake State Park also offers cabin rentals, hiking trails, and a visitor center with displays on the area’s natural and cultural history.

See also
List of California state parks

References

External links
Clear Lake State Park

1949 establishments in California
Parks in Lake County, California
Protected areas established in 1949
State parks of California